The ALP was a Belgian automobile built in 1920 by Automobiles Leroux-Pisart of Brussels.  It was a 2121 cc light car designed by the former chief engineer of Métallurgique.

References

 

Vintage vehicles
Defunct motor vehicle manufacturers of Belgium